St. Joseph's Church, Mannanam is a Syro-Malabar Catholic Church located in Mannanam, Kerala. The church was built by St. Kuriakose Elias Chavara on top of a hill and his mortal remains are interred in the church.

Pilgrimage center
The church is an important pilgrimage center for followers of Saint Kuriakose Elias Chavara. The church was commissioned by him on 11 May 1831 and completed in 1837. It was subsequently renovated in 1955 and 1996. The church compound also houses the residential unit used by the saint. In 2014, when Fr. Kuriakose Elias Chavara was canonized as a saint, 60,000 people attended the thanksgiving mass at the church complex which was celebrated by 100 priests.

St. Kuriakose also started the first printing press in Kottayam in the church complex in 1846. The printing press was used to bring out the first Malayalam daily Nasrani Deepika. When St. Kuriakose died in 1871, he was buried at St. Philomina's Church, Koonammavu. His mortal remains were later transferred to the St. Joseph Church in 1889.

References

Syro-Malabar Catholic church buildings
Churches in Kottayam district